Gabriel Ananda (born in Bad Driburg, Germany) is a German DJ and producer of techno music.

Career 
Ananda was interested in music at an early age, but it wasn't until 1995 when he experienced a live set by Sven Väth he got interested in electronic music. Ananda made his debut as a producer as half of the duo Da Hairy Belafontes on the label Hörspielmusik, with the three-track EP 'Daylight Comes and We Don't Want to Go Home' in 1998. He went on to release singles on Treibstoff, Trapez, Platzhirsch, and Karmarouge before producing what was for him, a life changing track. His 2004 release of "Süssholz" went to the top of the German DJ charts. It was followed by another hit in 2005 titled 'Ihre persönliche Glücksmelodie', and then 'Doppelwhipper' in 2006.

In 2008, Ananda founded his own record label, Basmati, as a place where he can release his own productions. And by the end of 2011, Basmati celebrated its 9th release, eight of those from Ananda.

In 2015, he played at the Welcome to the Future festival in the Netherlands.

Discography

Albums 
 2004: Tai Nasha No Karosha (Karmarouge)
 2007: Bambusbeats (Karmarouge)
 2009: Remastered Classics On Trapez (Trapez)
 2011: Selected Techno Works (Basmati)

Singles & EPs

References 

Living people
German DJs
German techno musicians
1977 births
Remixers
People from Bad Driburg
Electronic dance music DJs